Jesse Marcus Taylor (born January 2, 1983) is an American professional mixed martial arts (MMA) and 10th Planet Brazilian Jiu Jitsu black belt fighter currently competing in the Welterweight division. A professional competitor since 2006, he was a cast member of SpikeTV's The Ultimate Fighter 7, winning his entry, preliminary, quarterfinal and semi-final matches, and then became infamous for being the only fighter to ever be removed from finals due to events that occurred after filming was completed. Taylor later won The Ultimate Fighter: Redemption Welterweight Tournament, and has also fought for top promotions such as Strikeforce, DREAM, MFC, AFC, Impact FC, Shark Fights, Cage Warriors and Absolute Championship Berkut.

Background
Jesse Taylor also known as "JT Money", graduated Poway High School where he was a wrestler. After high school Jesse attended San Francisco State university.  He took Jiu-Jitsu classes but decided to stick to Wrestling. When things did not work out in San Francisco he moved back down to San Diego, where he then attended Palomar College near San Diego. In junior college, Taylor became a two-time JC All-American, CCCAA State Runner-Up in 2003, and crowned California Junior College State Champion in 2004, only losing three matches. Taylor was then rewarded with a scholarship to Cal State Fullerton. After the birth of his son, it became harder for Taylor to concentrate on Wrestling and school while adjusting to the family life. Taylor still managed to qualify for the Division 1 NCAA Tournament and was 3rd in the Pac-10's.

After realizing there was no money in Wrestling after college (a sentiment echoed by many former collegiate wrestlers, including Matt Hughes, Randy Couture, and Bobby Lashley), Taylor tried to think of a way to still compete and make a living for him and his son. He then decided to give mixed martial arts a real try. An old Wrestling friend of his invited him for a Team Quest workout, where Taylor was able to spar with fighters such as Dan Henderson, Rameau Thierry Sokoudjou, and Jason Miller. He picked up Jiu Jitsu quickly, and worked to improve his striking.  After only about a month of training, Taylor took a fight against a much more established fighter and was victorious. A few years later Jesse got the chance to be on the seventh season of the hit reality television series The Ultimate Fighter

Mixed martial arts career

The Ultimate Fighter
In the second episode Jesse Taylor won his entry match against Nick Rossborough by rear naked choke. After all entry matches were done the teams were to pick the fighters that they wanted. Taylor was picked sixth overall by Forrest Griffin. With Quinton Jackson getting the first pick for fighters, Griffin was to choose the first preliminary fight. Griffin chose Taylor to take on Mike Dolce; In the second round, Taylor won the fight again via a rear naked choke. Taylor's quarterfinal fight was against Dante Rivera, which Taylor also won, this time via unanimous decision. Taylor had now advanced to the semi-finals against his close friend Tim Credeur, a fight which Taylor won by unanimous decision, putting him into the finals.

Removal from finale
Taylor was removed from the finals after a security recording was presented to Dana White. He was shown kicking out one of the side windows of a rented limousine. The staff of the hotel where the incident occurred reported that a drunken Taylor had frightened female patrons and confronted hotel security by acting aggressively and screaming that he was a UFC fighter. White told Taylor that this type of behavior was unacceptable, and that he believed Taylor did not possess the mental discipline to deal with the pressures of fame and popularity that being in the UFC would put on him. White told Taylor that because of his actions he had forfeited his place in the final match, a decision that an emotional Taylor did not try to protest. However, White went on to thank Taylor for his efforts in the show, and advised him to "go home, get your life together, call me in a few months." Later, in the July fight promo footage for UFC: Silva vs. Irvin, White recounted a conversation he had with Taylor:

UFC career
Following his removal from The Ultimate Fighter, Taylor was offered a fight against C.B. Dollaway at UFC Fight Night: Silva vs. Irvin on July 19, 2008. He lost the fight via a Peruvian necktie submission in the first round. On July 29 the Wrestling Observer reported that Taylor had been released from the UFC.

Post UFC
In his first fight since his release from the UFC, Taylor fought Drew Fickett at a catchweight of 175 pounds. Taylor upset the more experienced Fickett, winning by TKO due to strikes in 1 minutes and 42 seconds. After the fight, Taylor then dropped down from middleweight to welterweight.

He later fought on January 15, where he was set to fight unbeaten Pat Minihan, instead Taylor fought Rico Altamirano, he defeated Altamirano via rear naked choke in the second round. Taylor fought on February 14, 2009 in Daytona Beach, Florida. He was set to go up against Esteban Ramos. Taylor ended up fighting and beating (1-0) fighter Gert Kocani. Taylor again won via rear naked choke in the second round.

Jesse fought on March 28, 2009 in Colorado. He took on Chris Camozzi, defeating him by decision. Jesse won the King of Champions belt held by Camozzi. On May 2, 2009, Taylor defeated MMA veteran Eric DaVila at Shark Fight 4. Taylor then won his sixth straight fight since being released from the UFC after defeating Rubén Darío at Total Combat 33. The fight was for the Total Combat middleweight title.

DREAM
One day after his win over Darío, Taylor was offered a fight for Japan promotion, DREAM. He made his debut on July 20, 2009 at DREAM 10 against Korean Judoka, Dong Sik Yoon. Taylor won after Yoon injured his ankle and was not able to continue.

Strikeforce
Nick Diaz was slated to face Jay Hieron for the Welterweight Championship belt. However, Diaz missed a pre-fight drug test mandated by the California State Athletic Commission and was denied a license to compete. Diaz was replaced by Taylor, who moved down to welterweight, and the fight was changed to a non-title bout. Taylor lost the match via unanimous decision.

Taylor had his second fight for the Strikeforce promotion on November 6, 2009 on the main card of the Strikeforce Challengers: Gurgel vs. Evangelista event. He lost to Luke Rockhold (5-1) in a middleweight contest.

Maximum Fighting Championship
Taylor signed a two-fight deal with Canadian-based promotion, Maximum Fighting Championship. His first fight was on the MFC 25 card against Thales Leites, losing in the first round by submission.

Before taking another fight with the MFC, Taylor fought former UFC middleweight champion Murilo Bustamante. In the second round of the fight, referee John McCarthy stood the pair up and as the fight was about to continue, Bustamante seemingly lost equilibrium and could not continue, giving Taylor the TKO victory.

His second fight for MFC took place on the main card of the MFC 26 card against Tom Watson. Taylor won via unanimous decision (30-26, 30-26, 30-26).

Independent promotions
Taylor was signed to fight Australian knockout artist, Dylan Andrews, at the inaugural Australian Fighting Championship event. The fight took place in Melbourne on November 12, 2010. Taylor won the fight midway into round one, choking Andrews unconscious from a guillotine choke.

Taylor was scheduled to fight PRIDE FC, UFC, and DREAM veteran, Denis Kang at Battlefield Fight League 7. Kang later pulled out of the fight, and Jesse moved up to Light Heavyweight to fight Clay Davidson, defeating him in a unanimous decision. The fight with Kang was rescheduled for May 28, 2011 at Battlefield Fight League 8. Taylor won by submission in the first round, getting Kang in a rear naked choke.

Taylor fought Bellator Middleweight champion Hector Lombard on September 3, 2011, in the main event at the Australian Fighting Championships.

Taylor replaced an injured Paulo Filho at KSW XVII and faced Mamed Khalidov.  He lost the fight via kneebar submission early in the first round.

Cage Warriors
Taylor faced Judo black belt Gaël Grimaud on May 24, 2012 in Isa Town, Bahrain at Cage Warriors Fight Night 6 for Grimaud's welterweight championship. Taylor dominated the first two rounds by utilizing his wrestling to take Grimaud down and control him throughout the round while also peppering Grimaud with short strikes. Early in the third round Grimaud took Taylor's back.  As Taylor was attempting to escape back control, Grimaud trapped Taylor's arm and transitioned to an armbar, forcing Taylor to submit and thus retaining his welterweight title.

On December 31, 2012, Jesse Taylor defeated former champion Chris Fields in Fields's hometown of Dublin, Ireland at Cage Warriors 51 to win the CWFC middleweight title.

Just two months removed from winning the Cage Warriors middleweight title, Taylor fought The Ultimate Fighter 3 winner, Kendall Grove. The fight was for Taylor's K-OZ Entertainment middleweight title he had won back in November 2012. The contest took place on February 23, 2013 in Perth, Western Australia. Taylor controlled the fight for five consecutive rounds, winning the fight via unanimous decision, and defending his middleweight title.

Taylor had his first Cage Warriors Middleweight title defense on May 4, 2013 on the Cage Warriors 54 card. Taylor fought, and defeated, "The White Tyson" John Phillips via submission early in the first round.

World Series of Fighting
A few weeks after his first successful Cage Warriors title defense, it was announced Taylor had signed an exclusive deal with the World Series of Fighting. Taylor will take part in the promotion's four-man middleweight tournament set to determine the first WSOF middleweight champion. Besides Taylor, the participants are Elvis Mutapčić, David Branch and Danillo Villefort.

Taylor was expected to fight Elvis Mutapčić in the opening round at WSOF 5. The New Jersey Athletic Commission cancelled the fight after seeing Mutapcic take an unknown and unapproved medication backstage before the fight. The fight was rescheduled for WSOF 7. Taylor won the fight via unanimous decision.

In the Middleweight tournament final, Taylor faced David Branch at World Series of Fighting 10 on June 21, 2014. He lost the fight via D'arce choke submission in the first round.

Battlegrounds
Taylor fought in the BattleGrounds MMA in a Single Night 8-Man Tournament on October 3, 2014. He lost his quarterfinal fight against Trey Houston via submission in the first round.

Arena Tour 6
Taylor had an upcoming fight against fellow UFC veteran Maiquel Falcao for Argentinian mma promotion Arena Tour on April 18, 2015.  Taylor lost the fight against Falcao by guillotine choke in the first round at 3:13.

League S-70
Taylor fought Michail Tsarev on August 29, 2015 at League S-70: Russia vs. World. He won the fight via Submission (guillotine choke).

Absolute Championship Berkut
Taylor lost in the first fight in the ACB lost to Aslambek Saidov at the ACB 40: Battleground on June 3, 2016 via submission (guillotine choke) in the first round.

Taylor faced Mukhamed Berkhamov on October 22, 2016 at ACB 48. He lost the fight via submission (armbar) in the first round.

Taylor had been expected to face Guillerme Martinez on 13 January 2017 at ACB 51 but Martinez instead faced Ivan Castillo.

The Ultimate Fighter: Redemption
On February 15 it was announced that Taylor would be joining the cast of Season 25 of The Ultimate Fighter.

During team picks in episode one Taylor joined team Dillashaw as T.J. Dillashaw's second pick, after current UFC Fighter James Krause. In episode 3, Taylor faced former training partner Mehdi Baghdad and won by unanimous decision to advance to the quarter-finals. He next faced Hayder Hassan and won the bout via submission in the first round. Taylor faced James Krause in the semi-finals and won via submission in the third round to advance to the finals.

UFC return
Nine years after his first stint on the show, Taylor fought Dhiego Lima in the finals on July 7, 2017 at The Ultimate Fighter: Redemption Finale. Taylor won the fight via rear-naked choke submission in the second round.

Taylor was expected to face Belal Muhammad on November 19, 2017 at UFC Fight Night 121. However on September 13, it was announced that Taylor was pulled from the card after being notified by USADA of a potential doping violation. He was flagged after an out-of-competition drug test conducted August 22. On October 13, USADA officially suspended Taylor one year for testing positive for anti-estrogen agent clomiphene.

One month after the suspension was lifted, Taylor was released from his UFC contract.

Post UFC 
Taylor went 2-1 on the regional scene, losing via first-round guillotine choke against Mukhamed Berkhamov at ACA 100 and then rebounding against fellow UFC vet Seth Baczynski at NWFA 1: Retribution and Daniel McWilliams at J Street Fights 2, submitting both with a rear-naked choke. He was booked against reigning champion Christian Leroy Duncan at Cage Warriors 148 for the CWFC Middleweight Championship on December 31, 2022, however he was involved in a hit and run the day before the event and had to pull out of the bout.

Personal life 
Jesse Taylor has two sons, Alexander, and Nikolaus. He also has a daughter, Lucy (born 2020). Before becoming a professional fighter, Taylor worked various jobs, including construction and personal training.

Championships and accomplishments
 Cage Warriors Fighting Championship
 CWFC Middleweight Championship (One time)
 One successful title defense
 K-Oz Entertainment Fights
 K-Oz Entertainment Middleweight Championship (One time; current)
 One successful title defense
 King of Champions
 King of Champions Middleweight Championship (One time)
 Total Combat
 Total Combat Middleweight Championship (One time)
 Ultimate Fighting Championship
 Winner of The Ultimate Fighter: Redemption (2017)
 Most wins on The Ultimate Fighter (7-0)

Mixed martial arts record 

|-
| Win
| align=center|33–16
| Daniel McWilliams
| Submission (rear-naked choke)
| J Street Fights 2
| 
| align=center| 1
| align=center| 0:28
| Bentonville, Arkansas, United States
| 
|-
| Win
| align=center|32–16
| Seth Baczynski
| Submission (rear-naked choke)
| NWFA 1: Retribution
| 
| align=center| 1
| align=center| 0:46
| Bentonville, Arkansas, United States
| 
|-
| Loss
| align=center| 31–16
| Mukhamed Berkhamov
| Submission (guillotine choke)
| ACA 100
| 
| align=center|1
| align=center| 1:13
| Grozny, Russia
|
|-
| Win
| align=center|31–15
| Dhiego Lima
| Submission (rear-naked choke)
| The Ultimate Fighter: Redemption Finale 
| 
| align=center|2
| align=center|0:43
| Las Vegas, Nevada, United States
| 
|-
| Loss
| align=center| 30–15
| Mukhamed Berkhamov
| Submission (armbar)
| |ACB 48
| 
| align=center|1
| align=center| 2:30
| Moscow, Russia
|
|-
| Win
| align=center| 30–14
| Seth Baczynski
| Decision (unanimous)
| TFE MMA: Vengeance
| 
| align=center| 3
| align=center| 5:00
| Anaheim, California, United States
|
|-
| Loss
| align=center| 29–14
| Aslambek Saidov
| Submission (guillotine choke)
| |ACB 40
| 
| align=center| 1
| align=center| 3:29
| Krasnodar krai, Russia
|
|-
| Loss
| align=center| 29–13
| Borys Mańkowski
| Submission (guillotine choke)
| KSW 32: Road to Wembley
| 
| align=center| 1
| align=center| 3:02
| London, England
| 
|-
| Win
| align=center| 29–12
| Michail Tsarev
| Submission (guillotine choke)
| League S-70: Russia vs. World
| 
| align=center| 1
| align=center| 0:40
| Sochi, Russia
|
|-
| Win
| align=center| 28–12
| Nick Barnes
| Technical Submission (rear-naked choke)
| Smash Global: The Main Event
| 
| align=center| 1
| align=center| 2:59
| San Diego, California, United States
| 
|-
| Loss
| align=center| 27–12
| Maiquel Falcão
| Submission (guillotine choke)
| Arena Tour 5: Falcao vs. Taylor
| 
| align=center| 1
| align=center| 3:13
| Buenos Aires, Argentina
| 
|-
| Loss
| align=center| 27–11
| Trey Houston
| Submission (armbar)
| BattleGrounds MMA 5 - O.N.E.
| 
| align=center| 1
| align=center| 2:10
| Tulsa, Oklahoma, United States
| 
|-
| Loss
| align=center| 27–10
| David Branch
| Submission (D'Arce choke)
| WSOF 10
| 
| align=center| 1
| align=center| 1:41
| Las Vegas, Nevada, United States
| 
|-
| Win
| align=center| 27–9
| Elvis Mutapčić
| Decision (unanimous)
| WSOF 7
| 
| align=center| 3
| align=center| 5:00
| Vancouver, British Columbia, Canada
| 
|-
| Win
| align=center| 26–9
| John Phillips
| Submission (guillotine choke)
| Cage Warriors 54
| 
| align=center| 1
| align=center| 2:43
| Cardiff, Wales
| 
|-
| Win
| align=center| 25–9
| Kendall Grove
| Decision (unanimous)
| K-Oz Entertainment: Bragging Rights 5
| 
| align=center| 5
| align=center| 5:00
| Perth, Western Australia
| 
|-
| Win
| align=center| 24–9
| Chris Fields
| Submission (rear-naked choke)
| Cage Warriors: 51
| 
| align=center| 2
| align=center| 1:06
| Dublin, Ireland
| 
|-
| Win
| align=center| 23–9
| Steve Kennedy
| Submission (rear-naked choke)
| K-Oz Entertainment: Bragging Rights 4
| 
| align=center| 1
| align=center| 4:01
| Perth, Australia
| 
|-
| Win
| align=center| 22–9
| Marcel Fortuna
| Decision (unanimous)
| Dragon House MMA 11: Taylor vs. Fortuna
| 
| align=center| 3
| align=center| 5:00
| Oakland, California, United States
| 
|-
| Win
| align=center| 21–9
| Christopher Ortega
| Submission (guillotine choke)
| CG: Cage Gladiator 7
| 
| align=center| 1
| align=center| 1:13
| Mexicali, Mexico
| 
|-
| Loss
| align=center| 20–9
| Gaël Grimaud
| Submission (armbar)	
| Cage Warriors Fight Night 6
| 
| align=center| 3
| align=center| 0:55
| Isa Town, Bahrain
| 
|-
| Loss
| align=center| 20–8
| Mamed Khalidov
| Submission (kneebar)	
| KSW 17: Revenge
| 
| align=center| 1
| align=center| 1:42
| Lódz, Poland
| 
|-
| Win
| align=center| 20–7
| Mario Trujillo
| Submission (rear-naked choke)	
| Ultimate Combat Challenge
| 
| align=center| 1
| align=center| 1:30
| Panama City, Panama
| 
|-
| Loss
| align=center| 19–7
| Hector Lombard
| Submission (heel hook)	
| Australian FC 2
| 
| align=center| 2
| align=center| 1:26
| Melbourne, Australia
| 
|-
| Win
| align=center| 19–6
| Denis Kang
| Submission (rear-naked choke)
| Battlefield Fight League 8
| 
| align=center| 1
| align=center| 1:57
| Nanaimo, British Columbia, Canada
| 
|-
| Win
| align=center| 18–6
| Clay Davidson
| Decision (unanimous)
| Battlefield Fight League 7
| 
| align=center| 3
| align=center| 5:00
| Nanaimo, British Columbia, Canada
| 
|-
| Win
| align=center| 17–6
| Dylan Andrews
| Technical Submission (guillotine choke)
| Australian FC 1
| 
| align=center| 1
| align=center| 2:33
| Melbourne, Australia
| 
|-
| Win
| align=center| 16–6
| Tom Watson
| Decision (unanimous)
| MFC 26
| 
| align=center| 3
| align=center| 5:00
| Brandon, Manitoba, Canada
| 
|-
| Win
| align=center| 15–6
| Murilo Bustamante
| TKO (retirement)
| Impact FC 2
| 
| align=center| 2
| align=center| 2:10
| Sydney, Australia
| 
|-
| Loss
| align=center| 14–6
| Thales Leites
| Submission (triangle choke)
| MFC 25
| 
| align=center| 1
| align=center| 2:27
| Edmonton, Alberta, Canada
| 
|-
| Win
| align=center| 14–5
| Jason Day
| Submission (rear-naked choke)
| AMMA 2: Vengeance
| 
| align=center| 1
| align=center| 1:14
| Edmonton, Alberta, Canada
| 
|-
| Loss
| align=center| 13–5
| Luke Rockhold
| Submission (rear-naked choke)
| Strikeforce Challengers: Gurgel vs. Evangelista
| 
| align=center| 1
| align=center| 3:42
| Fresno, California, United States
| 
|-
| Loss
| align=center| 13–4
| Jay Hieron
| Decision (unanimous)
| Strikeforce: Carano vs. Cyborg
| 
| align=center| 3
| align=center| 5:00
| San Jose, California, United States
| 
|-
| Win
| align=center| 13–3
| Yoon Dong-Sik
| TKO (ankle injury)
| DREAM 10
| 
| align=center| 1
| align=center| 1:02
| Saitama, Japan
| 
|-
| Win
| align=center| 12–3
| Rubén Barboza
| Submission (rear-naked choke)
| Total Combat 33
| 
| align=center| 1
| align=center| 3:13
| Mexico City, Mexico
| 
|-
| Win
| align=center| 11–3
| Eric Davila
| Submission (rear-naked choke)
| Shark Fights 4
| 
| align=center| 1
| align=center| 2:29
| Lubbock, Texas, United States
| 
|-
| Win
| align=center| 10–3
| Chris Camozzi
| Decision (unanimous)
| King of Champions 3
| 
| align=center| 3
| align=center| 5:00
| Denver, Colorado, United States
| 
|-
| Win
| align=center| 9–3
| Gert Kocani
| Submission (rear-naked choke)
| Xtreme Cagefighting Federation 1
| 
| align=center| 2
| align=center| 4:45
| Daytona Beach, Florida, United States
| 
|-
| Win
| align=center| 8–3
| Rico Altamirano
| Submission (rear-naked choke)
| The Warriors Cage 1
| 
| align=center| 2
| align=center| 2:00
| Porterville, California, United States
| 
|-
| Win
| align=center| 7–3
| Drew Fickett
| TKO (punches and elbows)
| Total Combat 32
| 
| align=center| 1
| align=center| 1:42
| El Cajon, California, United States
| 
|-
| Loss
| align=center| 6–3
| C.B. Dollaway
| Submission (Peruvian necktie)
| UFC Fight Night: Silva vs. Irvin
| 
| align=center| 1
| align=center| 3:58
| Las Vegas, Nevada, United States
| 
|-
| Win
| align=center| 6–2
| Jorge Ramirez
| TKO (punches)
| MMA Xtreme 15
| 
| align=center| 1
| align=center| 0:42
| Mexico City, Mexico
| 
|-
| Win
| align=center| 5–2
| Matt Major
| Decision (unanimous)
| Melee on the Mountain
| 
| align=center| 3
| align=center| 5:00
| Friant, California, United States
| 
|-
| Loss
| align=center| 4–2
| Kenny Ento
| Submission (triangle choke)
| PRIMAL MMA
| 
| align=center| 1
| align=center| 0:37
| Tijuana, Mexico
| 
|-
| Win
| align=center| 4–1
| Jorge Ortiz
| TKO (punches)
| Total Combat 21
| 
| align=center| 2
| align=center| 1:49
| San Diego, California, United States
| 
|-
| Loss
| align=center| 3–1
| Jesse Forbes
| Submission (armbar)
| Tuff-N-Uff 2
| 
| align=center| 1
| align=center| 1:21
| Las Vegas, Nevada, United States
| 
|-
| Win
| align=center| 3–0
| Noel Rodriguez
| Submission (rear-naked choke)
| MMA Xtreme 9
| 
| align=center| 2
| align=center| 1:03
| Tijuana, Mexico
| 
|-
| Win
| align=center| 2–0
| Chris Chiasson
| TKO (punches)
| No Limits MMA
| 
| align=center| 2
| align=center| 1:28
| San Clemente, California, United States
| 
|-
| Win
| align=center| 1–0
| Robert Sarkozi
| Decision (unanimous)
| KOTC: Rapid Fire
| 
| align=center| 2
| align=center| 5:00
| San Jacinto, California, United States
| 

| Win
| align=center| 7–0
| James Krause
| Technical Submission (guillotine choke)
| rowspan=3|The Ultimate Fighter 25
|  (airdate)
| align=center|3
| align=center|2:32
| rowspan=3|Las Vegas, Nevada, United States
| 
|-
| Win
| align=center| 6–0
| Hayder Hassan
| Submission (rear-naked choke)
|  (airdate)
| align=center|1
| align=center|2:24
| 
|-
| Win
| align=center| 5–0
| Mehdi Baghdad
| Decision (unanimous)
|  (airdate)
| align=center|2
| align=center|5:00
| 
|-
| Win
| align=center| 4–0
| Tim Credeur
| Decision (unanimous)
| rowspan=4|The Ultimate Fighter 7
|  (airdate)
| align=center|3
| align=center|5:00
| rowspan=4|Las Vegas, Nevada, United States
| 
|-
| Win
| align=center| 3–0
| Dante Rivera
| Decision (unanimous)
|  (airdate)
| align=center|2
| align=center|5:00
| 
|-
| Win
| align=center| 2–0
| Mike Dolce
| Submission (rear-naked choke)
|  (airdate)
| align=center|2 
| align=center|1:47 
| 
|-
| Win
| align=center| 1–0
| Nick Rossborough
| Submission (rear-naked choke)
|  (airdate)
| align=center|1 
| align=center|1:50 
|

See also
 List of male mixed martial artists
 List of current UFC fighters

References

External links
 
 
 

1983 births
Living people
American practitioners of Brazilian jiu-jitsu
People awarded a black belt in Brazilian jiu-jitsu
American male mixed martial artists
American sportspeople in doping cases
Doping cases in mixed martial arts
People from Murrieta, California
Mixed martial artists from California
Light heavyweight mixed martial artists
Middleweight mixed martial artists
Welterweight mixed martial artists
Mixed martial artists utilizing collegiate wrestling
Mixed martial artists utilizing Brazilian jiu-jitsu
San Francisco State University alumni
Ultimate Fighting Championship male fighters
American male sport wrestlers
Amateur wrestlers